The 2017 Texas Rangers season was the franchise's 57th overall, their 46th in Arlington, Texas and their 24th at Globe Life Park in Arlington. The Rangers began the season on April 3 against the Cleveland Indians and  finished the season on October 1 against the Oakland A's.

Offseason and spring training
The Rangers posted a 17–16 win–loss record in pre-season spring training, as well as playing three tied games that were not included in the standings.

Regular season

Season standings

American League West

American League Wild Card

Record against opponents

Opening Day lineup

Starting 9

Game log

|- style="background:#fbb"
| 1 || April 3 || Indians || 5–8 || Miller (1–0) || Dyson (0–1) || Allen (1) || 48,350 || 0–1 || L1
|- style="background:#fbb"
| 2 || April 4 || Indians || 3–4 || Carrasco (1–0) || Pérez (0–1) || Allen (2) || 23,574 || 0–2 || L2
|- style="background:#fbb"
| 3 || April 5 || Indians || 6–9 || Armstrong (1–0) || Dyson (0–2) || Shaw (1) || 24,649 || 0–3 || L3
|- style="background:#cfc"
| 4 || April 7 || Athletics || 10–5 || Claudio (1–0) || Alcantara (0–1) || — || 34,235 || 1–3 || W1 
|- style="background:#fbb"
| 5 || April 8 || Athletics || 1–6 || Graveman (2–0) || Darvish (0–1) || — || 44,410 || 1–4 || L1 
|- style="background:#cfc"
| 6 || April 9 || Athletics || 8–1 || Pérez (1–1) || Manaea (0–1) || — || 36,905 || 2–4 || W1
|- style="background:#fbb"
| 7 || April 11 || @ Angels || 5–6 (10) || Bedrosian (1–0) || Jeffress (0–1) || — || 34,044 || 2–5 || L1
|- style="background:#cfc"
| 8 || April 12 || @ Angels || 8–3 || Griffin (1–0) || Chavez (1–1) || Leclerc (1) || 34,599 || 3–5 || W1
|- style="background:#cfc"
| 9 || April 13 || @ Angels || 8–3 || Darvish (1–1) || Nolasco (0–2) || — || 30,255 || 4–5 || W2 
|- style="background:#fbb
| 10 || April 14 || @ Mariners || 1–2 || Hernandez (1–1) || Leclerc (0–1) || Díaz (2) || 41,855 || 4–6 || L1
|- style="background:#fbb"
| 11 || April 15 || @ Mariners || 0–5 || Paxton (2–0) || Cashner (0–1) || — || 34,927 || 4–7 || L2
|- style="background:#fbb"
| 12 || April 16 || @ Mariners || 7–8 || Diaz (1–1) || Dyson (0–3) || — || 19,678 || 4–8 || L3
|- style="background:#cfc"
| 13 || April 17 || @ Athletics || 7–0 || Griffin (2–0) || Cotton (1–2) || — || 10,406 || 5–8 || W1
|- style="background:#fbb"
| 14 || April 18 || @ Athletics || 2–4 || Triggs (3–0) || Darvish (1–2) || Casilla (2) || 12,091 || 5–9 || L1
|- style="background:#fbb"
| 15 || April 19 || @ Athletics || 1–9 || Hahn (1–1) || Pérez (1–2) || — || 14,031 || 5–10 || L2
|- style="background:#cfc"
| 16 || April 20 || Royals || 1–0 (13) || Álvarez (1–0) || Wood (0–1) || — || 26,898 || 6–10 || W1
|- style="background:#cfc"
| 17 || April 21 || Royals || 6–2 || Hamels (1–0) || Karns (0–1) || — || 31,320 || 7–10 || W2
|- style="background:#cfc"
| 18 || April 22 || Royals || 2–1 || Bush (1–0) || Wood (0–2) || — || 41,446 || 8–10 || W3 
|- style="background:#cfc"
| 19 || April 23 || Royals || 5–2 || Darvish (2–2) || Hammel (0–2) || Bush (1) || 37,177 || 9–10 || W4
|- style="background:#fbb"
| 20 || April 24 || Twins || 2–3 || Hughes (3–1) || Pérez (1–3) || Kintzler (5)  || 19,027 || 9–11 || L1
|- style="background:#fbb"
| 21 || April 25 || Twins || 1–8 || Santana (4–0) || Cashner (0–2) || — || 20,568 || 9–12 || L2
|- style="background:#cfc"
| 22 || April 26 || Twins || 14–3 || Hamels (2–0) || Rogers (1–1) || — || 22,365 || 10–12 || W1
|- style="background:#fbb"
| 23 || April 28 || Angels || 3–6 || Guerra (1–1) || Jeffress (0–2) || Alvarez (1) || 28,968 || 10–13 || L1
|-  style="background:#cfc"
| 24 || April 29 || Angels || 6–3 || Darvish (3–2) || Chavez (2–4) || — || 44,597 || 11–13 || W1
|- style="background:#fbb"
| 25 || April 30 || Angels || 2–5 || Ramírez (3–2) || Pérez (1–4) || Norris (5) || 38,804|| 11–14 || L1
|-

|- style="background:#fbb"
| 26 || May 1 || @ Astros || 2–5 || Devenski (2–1) || Cashner (0–3) || Giles (7) || 22,556 || 11–15 || L2
|- style="background:#fbb"
| 27 || May 2 || @ Astros || 7–8 || Hoyt  (1–0) || Kela (0–1) || Harris (1) || 26,208|| 11–16 || L3
|- style="background:#fbb"
| 28 || May 3 || @ Astros || 1–10 || Morton (3–2) || Martinez (0–1) || — || 27,439 || 11–17 || L4
|- style="background:#cfc"
| 29 || May 4 || @ Astros || 10–4 || Griffin (3–0) || Musgrove (1–3) || — || 27,391 || 12–17 || W1
|- style="background:#cfc"
| 30 || May 5 || @ Mariners || 3–1 (13) || Bush (2–0) || Pagan (0–1) || Claudio (1) || 26,938 || 13–17 || W2
|- style="background:#fbb"
| 31 || May 6 || @ Mariners || 2–8 || Pazos (1–1) || Pérez (1–5) || — || 36,044 || 13–18 || L1
|- style="background:#fbb"
| 32 || May 7 || @ Mariners || 3–4 || Rzepczynski (1–0) || Dyson (0–4) || Diaz (6) || 32,518 || 13–19 || L2
|- style="background:#fbb"
| 33 || May 8 || @ Padres || 1–5 || Cahill (3–2) || Martinez (0–2) || — || 17,756 || 13–20 || L3
|- style="background:#cfc"
| 34 || May 9 || @ Padres || 11–0 || Griffin (4–0) || Weaver (0–4) || — || 14,224 || 14–20 || W1
|- style="background:#cfc"
| 35 || May 10 || Padres || 4–3 || Jeffress (1–2) || Hand (0–2) || Bush (2) || 24,350 || 15–20 || W2
|- style="background:#cfc"
| 36 || May 11 || Padres || 5–2 || Dyson (1–4) || Maurer (0–2) || — || 22,405 || 16–20 || W3 
|- style="background:#cfc"
| 37 || May 12 || Athletics || 5–2 || Kela (1–1) || Casilla (1–2) || — || 35,625 || 17–20 || W4 
|- style="background:#cfc"
| 38 || May 13 || Athletics || 6–5 || Barnette (1–1) || Dull (1–2) || Bush (3) || 37,898 || 18–20 || W5  
|- style="background:#cfc"
| 39 || May 14 || Athletics || 6–4 || Álvarez (2–0) || Madson (0–3) || Bush (4) || 35,157 || 19–20 || W6 
|- style="background:#cfc"
| 40 || May 16 || Phillies || 5–1 || Darvish (4–2) || Eickhoff (0–4) || — || 23,110 || 20–20 || W7  
|- style="background:#cfc"
| 41 || May 17 || Phillies || 9–3 || Cashner (1–3) || Eflin (0–1) || — || 28,703 || 21–20 || W8 
|- style="background:#cfc"
| 42 || May 18 || Phillies || 8–4 || Pérez (2–5) || Rodriguez (1–2) || — || 35,007 || 22–20 || W9 
|- style="background:#cfc"
| 43 || May 19 || @ Tigers || 5–3 || Martinez (1–2) || Norris (2–3) || Bush (5) || 33,122 || 23–20 || W10 
|- style="background:#fbb"
| 44 || May 20 || @ Tigers || 3–9 || Verlander (4–3) || Griffin (4–1) || — || 35,166 || 23–21 || L1
|- style="background:#cfc"
| 45 || May 21 || @ Tigers || 5–2 || Darvish (5–2) || Boyd (2–4) || Kela (1) || 24,080 || 24–21 || W1 
|- style="background:#fbb"
| 46 || May 23 || @ Red Sox || 6–11 || Porcello (3–5) || Cashner (1–4) || — || 34,769 || 24–22 || L1
|- style="background:#fbb"
| 47 || May 24 || @ Red Sox || 4–9 || Sale (5–2) || Dyson (1–5) || — || 36,089 || 24–23 || L2
|- style="background:#fbb"
| 48 || May 25 || @ Red Sox || 2–6 || Pomeranz (4–3) || Martinez (1–3) || — || 33,484 || 24–24 || L3
|- style="background:#fbb"
| 49 || May 26 || @ Blue Jays || 6–7 || Loup (2–0) || Griffin (4–2) || Osuna (8) || 40,754 || 24–25 || L4
|- style="background:#fbb"
| 50 || May 27 || @ Blue Jays || 1–3 || Estrada (4–2) || Darvish (5–3) || Osuna (9) || 46,825 || 24–26 || L5
|- style="background:#cfc"
| 51 || May 28 || @ Blue Jays || 3–1 || Cashner (2–4) || Biagini (1–3) || Bush (6) || 46,188 || 25–26 || W1
|- style="background:#fbb"
| 52 || May 29 || Rays || 8–10 || De Leon (1–0) || Barnette (1–1) || Colomé (14) || 35,914 || 25–27 || L1
|- style="background:#cfc"
| 53 || May 30 || Rays || 9–5 || Kela (2–1) || Whitley (1–1) || — || 22,942 || 26–27 || W1
|- style="background:#fbb"
| 54 || May 31 || Rays || 5–7 (10) || Pruitt (4–1) || Dyson (1–6) || Colomé (15) || 24,410 || 26–28 || L1
|- style="background:#cfc"

|- style="text-align:center; background-color:#fbb"
| 55 || June 2 || Astros || 1–7 || Keuchel (9–0) || Darvish (5–4) || — || 39,729 || 26–29 || L2
|- style="text-align:center; background-color:#fbb"
| 56 || June 3 || Astros || 5–6 || Devenski (4–3) || Cashner (2–5) || Giles (15) || 44,168 || 26–30 || L3
|- style="text-align:center; background-color:#fbb"
| 57 || June 4 || Astros || 2–7 || Peacock (3–0) || Pérez  (2–6) || — || 39,204 || 26–31 || L4
|- style="text-align:center; background-color:#cfc"
| 58 || June 6 || Mets || 10–8 || Bibens-Dirkx (1–0) || deGrom (4–3) || — || 32,617 || 27–31 || W1
|- style="text-align:center; background-color:#fbb"
| 59 || June 7 || Mets || 3–4 || Blevins (3–0) || Bush (2–1) || Reed (9) || 32,477 || 27–32 || L1
|- style="text-align:center; background-color:#cfc"
| 60 || June 9 || @ Nationals || 5–2 || Cashner (3–5) || Roark (6–3) || Bush (7) || 38,332 || 28–32 || W1 
|- style="text-align:center; background-color:#cfc"
| 61 || June 10 || @ Nationals || 6–3 (11) || Kela (3–1) || Kelley (3–2) || — || 32,157 || 29–32 || W2 
|- style="text-align:center; background-color:#cfc"
| 62 || June 11 || @ Nationals || 5–1 || Bibens-Dirkx (2–0) || Scherzer (7–4) || — || 32,027 || 30–32 || W3 
|- style="text-align:center; background-color:#cfc"
| 63 || June 12 || @ Astros || 6–1 || Darvish (6–4) || Musgrove (4–5) || — || 25,698 || 31–32 || W4
|- style="text-align:center; background-color:#cfc"
| 64 || June 13 || @ Astros || 4–2 || Leclerc (1–1) || Gregerson (2–2) || Bush (8) || 27,615 || 32–32 || W5
|- style="text-align:center; background-color:#fbb"
| 65 || June 14 || @ Astros || 2–13 || Martes (1–0) || Cashner (3–6) || — || 37,221 || 32–33 || L1
|- style="text-align:center; background-color:#cfc"
| 66 || June 16 || Mariners || 10–4 || Ross (1–0) || Paxton (5–2) || — || 33,960 || 33–33 || W1
|- style="text-align:center; background-color:#cfc"
| 67 || June 17 || Mariners || 10–4 || Pérez (3–6) || Gallardo (3–7) || — || 35,928 || 34–33 || W2
|- style="text-align:center; background-color:#fbb"
| 68 || June 18 || Mariners || 3–7 || Bergman (4–4) || Darvish (6–5) || — || 31,552 || 34–34 || L1 
|- style="text-align:center; background-color:#fbb"
| 69 || June 19 || Blue Jays || 6–7 || Beliveau (1–0) || Bush (2–2) || Osuna (18) || 25,115 || 34–35 || L2
|- style="text-align:center; background-color:#cfc"
| 70 || June 20 || Blue Jays || 6–1 || Martinez (2–3) || Liriano (3–3) || — || 24,169 || 35–35 || W1
|- style="text-align:center; background-color:#fbb"
| 71 || June 21 || Blue Jays || 5–7 || Biagini (2–6) || Ross (1–1) || Osuna (19) || 28,376 || 35–36 || L1
|- style="text-align:center; background-color:#cfc"
| 72 || June 22 || Blue Jays || 11–4 || Pérez (4–6) || Stroman (7–4) || — || 26,764 || 36–36 || W1
|- style="text-align:center; background-color:#fbb"
| 73 || June 23 || @ Yankees || 1–2 (10) || Shreve (2–1) || Bush (2–3) || — || 39,602 || 36–37 || L1
|- style="text-align:center; background-color:#cfc"
| 74 || June 24 || @ Yankees || 8–1 || Bibens-Dirkx (3–0) || Cessa (0–2) || — || 40,225 || 37–37 || W1
|- style="text-align:center; background-color:#cfc"
| 75 || June 25 || @ Yankees || 7–6 || Martinez (3–3) || Pineda (7–4) || Bush (9) || 46,625 || 38–37 || W2
|- style="text-align:center; background-color:#fbb"
| 76 || June 26 || @ Indians || 9–15 || Shaw (2–2) || Scheppers (0–1) || — || 17,672 || 38–38 || L1 
|- style="text-align:center; background-color:#cfc"
| 77 || June 27 || @ Indians || 2–1 || Kela (4–1) || Allen (0–4) || Bush (10) || 19,348 || 39–38 || W1
|- style="text-align:center; background-color:#fbb"
| 78 || June 28 || @ Indians || 3–5 || Bauer (7–6) || Darvish (6–6) || — || 21,200 || 39–39 || L1
|- style="text-align:center; background-color:#fbb"
| 79 || June 29 || @ Indians || 1–5 || Kluber (7–2) || Cashner (3–7) || — || 23,996 || 39–40 || L2
|- style="text-align:center; background-color:#fbb"
| 80 || June 30 || @ White Sox || 7–8 || Swarzak (4–2) || Bush (2–4) || — || 18,838 || 39–41 || L3
|-

|- style="text-align:center; background-color:#cfc"
| 81 || July 1 || @ White Sox || 10–4 || Hamels (3–0) || Holland (5–8) || — || 22,915 || 40–41 || W1
|- style="text-align:center; background-color:#fbb"
| 82 || July 2 || @ White Sox || 5–6 || Robertson (4–2) || Leclerc (1–2) || — || 26,206 || 40–42 || L1
|- style="text-align:center; background-color:#fbb"
| 83 || July 3 || Red Sox || 5–7 (11) || Hembree (1–2) || Frieri (0–1) || — || 45,448 || 40–43 || L2
|- style="text-align:center; background-color:#fbb"
| 84 || July 4 || Red Sox || 4–11 || Price (4–2) || Darvish (6–7) || — || 43,267 || 40–44 || L3
|- style="text-align:center; background-color:#cfc"
| 85 || July 5 || Red Sox || 8–2 || Cashner (4–7) || Fister (0–2) || — || 32,276 || 41–44 || W1
|- style="text-align:center; background-color:#cfc"
| 86 || July 7 || Angels || 10–0 || Hamels (4–0) || Nolasco (4–10) || — || 40,276 || 42–44 || W2
|- style="text-align:center; background-color:#cfc"
| 87 || July 8 || Angels || 5–2 || Ross (2–1) || Chavez (5–10) || — || 36,817 || 43–44 || W3
|- style="text-align:center; background-color:#fbb"
| 88 || July 9 || Angels || 0–3 || Ramirez (8–7) || Darvish (6–8) || Norris (13) || 28,384 || 43–45 || L1
|- style="text-align:center; background:#bbcaff;"
| colspan="10" | 88th All-Star Game in Miami, Florida
|- style="text-align:center; background-color:#cfc"
| 89 || July 14 || @ Royals || 5–3 || Pérez (5–6) || Minor (5–2) || Claudio (2) || 35,591 || 44–45 || W1
|- style="text-align:center; background-color:#cfc"
| 90 || July 15 || @ Royals || 1–0 || Leclerc (2–2) || Duffy (5–6) || Claudio (3) || 32,907 || 45–45 || W2
|- style="text-align:center; background-color:#fbb"
| 91 || July 16 || @ Royals || 3–4 || Herrera (2–2) || Grilli (2–5) || — || 23,163 || 45–46 || L1 
|- style="text-align:center; background-color:#fbb"
| 92 || July 17 || @ Orioles || 1–3 || Bleier (2–1) || Cashner (4–8) || Brach (15) || 14,922 || 45–47 || L2
|- style="text-align:center; background-color:#fbb"
| 93 || July 18 || @ Orioles || 1–12 || Bundy (9–8) || Ross (2–2) || — || 18,119 || 45–48 || L3
|- style="text-align:center; background-color:#fbb"
| 94 || July 19 || @ Orioles || 2–10 || Gausman (6–7) || Pérez (5–7) || — || 15,693 || 45–49 || L4
|- style="text-align:center; background-color:#fbb"
| 95 || July 20 || @ Orioles || 7–9 || Castro (2–1) || Hamels (4–1) || — || 14,961 || 45–50 || L5
|- style="text-align:center; background-color:#cfc"
| 96 || July 21 || @ Rays || 4–3 (10) || Claudio (2–0) || Boxberger (2–1) || — || 24,461 || 46–50 || W1
|- style="text-align:center; background-color:#cfc"
| 97 || July 22 || @ Rays || 4–3 || Cashner (5–8) || Archer (7–6) || Claudio (4) || 20,568 || 47–50 || W2
|- style="text-align:center; background-color:#cfc"
| 98 || July 23 || @ Rays || 6–5 || Bush (3–4) || Boxberger (2–2) || Leclerc (2) || 16,954 || 48–50 || W3
|- style="text-align:center; background-color:#fbb"
| 99 || July 24 || Marlins || 0–4 || Conley (3–3) || Perez (5–8) || — || 24,654 || 48–51 || L1 
|- style="text-align:center; background-color:#cfc"
| 100 || July 25 || Marlins || 10–4 || Hamels (5–1) || Straily (7–6) || — || 25,074 || 49–51 || W1
|- style="text-align:center; background-color:#fbb"
| 101 || July 26 || Marlins || 10–22 || Ureña (9–4) || Darvish (6–9) || — || 26,471 || 49–52 || L1
|- style="text-align:center; background-color:#cfc"
| 102 || July 28 || Orioles || 8–2 || Cashner (6–8) || Tillman (1–6) ||   || 36,270 || 50–52 || W1
|- style="text-align:center; background-color:#fbb"
| 103 || July 29 || Orioles || 0–4 || Gausman (8–7) || Bibens-Dirkx (3–1) || Britton (7) || 44,658 || 50–53 || L1 
|- style="text-align:center; background-color:#fbb"
| 104 || July 30 || Orioles || 6–10 || Miley (5–9) || Perez (5–9) || Britton (8) || 32,437 || 50–54 || L2 
|- style="text-align:center; background-color:#fbb"
| 105 || July 31 || Mariners || 4–6 || Phelps (3–5) || Claudio (2–1) || Díaz (20) || 22,294 || 50–55 || L3
|-

|- style="text-align:center; background-color:#fbb"
| 106 || August 1 || Mariners || 7–8 || Lawrence (1–3) || Martinez (3–4) || Diaz (21) || 21,200 || 50–56 || L4
|- style="text-align:center; background-color:#cfc"
| 107 || August 2 || Mariners || 5–1 || Cashner (7–8) || Miranda (7–5) || — || 23,041 || 51–56 || W1
|- style="text-align:center; background-color:#cfc"
| 108 || August 3 || @ Twins || 4–1 || Griffin (5–2) || Mejia (4–5) || Claudio (5) || 22,903 || 52–56 || W2
|- style="text-align:center; background-color:#fbb"
| 109 || August 4 || @ Twins || 4–8 || Colón (3–9) || Perez (5–10) || — || 22,272 || 52–57 || L1
|- style="text-align:center; background-color:#cfc"
| 110 || August 5 || @ Twins || 4–1 || Hamels (6–1) || Gibson (6–9) || — || 27,415 || 53–57 || W1
|- style="text-align:center; background-color:#fbb"
| 111 || August 6 || @ Twins || 5–6 || Berríos (10–5) || Bibens-Dirkx (3–2) || Belisle (1) || 29,056 || 53–58 || L1
|- style="text-align:center; background-color:#fbb"
| 112 || August 8 || @ Mets || 4–5 || Flexen (1–1) || Griffin (5–3) || Ramos (21) || 37,326 || 53–59 || L2
|- style="text-align:center; background-color:#cfc"
| 113 || August 9 || @ Mets || 5–1 || Perez (6–10) || Montero (1–8) || — || 34,222 || 54–59 || W1
|- style="text-align:center; background-color:#cfc"
| 114 || August 11 || Astros || 6–4 || Hamels (7–1) || Morton (9–5) || — || 33,897 || 55–59 || W2
|- style="text-align:center; background-color:#cfc"
| 115 || August 12 || Astros || 8–3 || Ross (3–2) || Fiers (7–7) || — || 47,306 || 56–59 || W3
|- style="text-align:center; background-color:#fbb"
| 116 || August 13 || Astros || 1–2 || Keuchel (10–2) || Cashner (7–9) || Giles (26) || 31,517 || 56–60 || L1
|- style="text-align:center; background-color:#cfc"
| 117 || August 14 || Tigers || 6–2 || Pérez (7–10) || Fulmer (10–10) || — || 21,041 || 57–60 || W1
|- style="text-align:center; background-color:#cfc"
| 118 || August 15 || Tigers || 10–4 || Griffin (6–3) || Verlander (8–8) || — || 20,636 || 58–60 || W2
|- style="text-align:center; background-color:#cfc"
| 119 || August 16 || Tigers || 12–6 || Hamels (8–1) || Bell (0–1) || — || 22,713 || 59–60 || W3
|- style="text-align:center; background-color:#cfc"
| 120 || August 17 || White Sox || 9–8 || Bibens-Dirkx (4–2) || Lopez (0–1) || Claudio (6) || 23,459 || 60–60 || W4 
|- style="text-align:center; background-color:#fbb"
| 121 || August 18 || White Sox || 3–4 || Infante (1–1) || Rodriguez (0–1) || Minaya (1) || 23,402 || 60–61 || L1
|- style="text-align:center; background-color:#cfc"
| 122 || August 19 || White Sox || 17–7 || Pérez (8–10) || Holland (6–13) || — || 33,441 || 61–61 || W1
|- style="text-align:center; background-color:#fbb"
| 123 || August 20 || White Sox || 2–3 || González (7–10) || Griffin (6–4) || Minaya (2) || 23,861 || 61–62 || L1
|- style="text-align:center; background-color:#cfc"
| 124 || August 21 || @ Angels || 5–3 || Hamels (9–1) || Skaggs (1–4) || Claudio (7) || 35,204 || 62–62 || W1
|- style="text-align:center; background-color:#fbb"
| 125 || August 22 || @ Angels || 1–10 || Middleton (5–1) || Ross (3–3) || — || 37,033 || 62–63 || L1
|- style="text-align:center; background-color:#cfc"
| 126 || August 23 || @ Angels || 7–5 (10) || Claudio (3–1) || Paredes (0–1) || Barnette (1) || 35,497 || 63–63 || W1
|- style="text-align:center; background-color:#cfc"
| 127 || August 24 || @ Angels || 3–0 || Pérez (9–10) || Scribner (2–1) || Rodriguez (1) || 34,032 || 64–63 || W2
|- style="text-align:center; background-color:#fbb"
| 128 || August 25 || @ Athletics || 1–3 || Graveman (4–4) || Martinez (3–5) || Treinen (9) || 14,499 || 64–64 || L1
|- style="text-align:center; background-color:#fbb"
| 129 || August 26 || @ Athletics || 3–8 || Manaea (9–8) || Hamels (9–2) || — || 22,471 || 64–65 || L2
|- style="text-align:center; background-color:#fbb"
| 130 || August 27 || @ Athletics || 3–8 || Cotton (7–10) || Griffin (3–7) || Treinen (10) || 16,335 || 64–66 || L3
|- style="text-align:center; background-color:#cfc"
| 131 || August 29 || @ Astros || 12–2 || Pérez (10–10) || Fiers (8–9) || — || 3,485 || 65–66 || W1
|- style="text-align:center; background-color:#cfc"
| 132 || August 30 || @ Astros || 8–1 || Cashner (8–9) || Keuchel (11–3) || — || 6,123 || 66–66 || W2 
|- style="text-align:center; background-color:#fbb"
| 133 || August 31 || @ Astros ||  1–5 || Devenski (7–3) || Martinez (3–6) || Giles (27) || 3,385 || 66–67 || L1 
|-

|- style="text-align:center; background-color:#cfc"
| 134 || September 1 || Angels || 10–9 || Claudio (4–1) || Bedrosian (4–4) || — || 32,240 || 67–67 || W1
|- style="text-align:center; background-color:#fbb"
| 135 || September 2 || Angels || 4–7 (10) || Petit (4–0) || Leclerc (2–3) || Parker (5) || 25,138 || 67–68 || L1
|- style="text-align:center; background-color:#cfc"
| 136 || September 3 || Angels || 7–6 || Pérez (11–10) || Heaney (1–1) || Barnette (2) || 28,783 || 68–68 || W1
|- style="text-align:center; background-color:#cfc"
| 137 || September 4 || @ Braves || 8–2 || Cashner (9–9) || Dickey (9–9) || — || 23,474 || 69–68 || W2
|- style="text-align:center; background-color:#bbb;"
| –  || September 5 || @ Braves ||colspan="9" | Postponed (rain). Makeup date: September 6th as a doubleheader.
|- style="text-align:center; background-color:#cfc"
| 138 || September 6 (1) || @ Braves || 12–8 || Bibens-Dirkx (5–2) || Gohara (0–1) || — || 19,971 || 70–68 || W3 
|- style="text-align:center; background-color:#fbb"
| 139 || September 6 (2) || @ Braves || 4–5 || Teherán (10–11) || Hamels (9–3) || Vizcaíno (10) || 20,364 || 70–69 || L1 
|- style="text-align:center; background-color:#cfc"
| 140 || September 8 || Yankees || 11–5 || Pérez (12–10) || Tanaka (11–11) || — || 35,883 || 71–69 || W1 
|- style="text-align:center; background-color:#fbb"
| 141 || September 9 || Yankees || 1–3 || Robertson (7–2) || Claudio (4–2) || Chapman (17) || 38,135 || 71–70 || L1
|- style="text-align:center; background-color:#fbb"
| 142 || September 10 || Yankees || 7–16 || Green (4–0) || Griffin (6–6) || — || 31,349 || 71–71 || L2 
|- style="text-align:center; background-color:#cfc"
| 143 || September 11 || Mariners || 5–3 || Hamels (10–3) || Miranda (8–7) || Claudio (8) || 20,686 || 72–71 || W1 
|- style="text-align:center; background-color:#fbb"
| 144 || September 12 || Mariners || 3–10 || Gonzales (1–1) || González (7–11) || — || 20,557 || 72–72 || L1 
|- style="text-align:center; background-color:#fbb"
| 145 || September 13 || Mariners || 1–8 || Leake (10–12) || Pérez (12–11) || — || 23,083 || 72–73 || L2
|- style="text-align:center; background-color:#fbb"
| 146 || September 14 || Mariners || 4–10 || Albers (5–1) || Cashner (9–10) || — || 21,931 || 72–74 || L3
|- style="text-align:center; background-color:#fbb"
| 147 || September 15 || @ Angels || 6–7 || Petit (5–0) || Mendez (0–1) || Parker (6) || 41,409 || 72–75 || L4
|- style="text-align:center; background-color:#fbb"
| 148 || September 16 || @ Angels || 0–2 || Bridwell (8–2) || Hamels (10–4) || Petit (4) || 40,719 || 72–76 || L5
|- style="text-align:center; background-color:#cfc"
| 149 || September 17 || @ Angels || 4–2 || González (8–11) || Richards (0–2) || Diekman (1) || 36,709 || 73–76 || W1
|- style="text-align:center; background-color:#cfc"
| 150 || September 19 || @ Mariners || 3–1 || Barnette (2–1) || Vincent (3–3) || Claudio (9) || 17,251 || 74–76 || W2 
|- style="text-align:center; background-color:#cfc"
| 151 || September 20 || @ Mariners || 8–6 || Cashner (10–10) || Hernández (5–5) || Claudio (10) || 15,962 || 75–76 || W3  
|- style="text-align:center; background-color:#cfc"
| 152 || September 21 || @ Mariners || 4–2 || Hamels (11–4) || Paxton (12–5) || Kela (2) || 14,849 || 76–76 || W4 
|- style="text-align:center; background-color:#fbb"
| 153 || September 22 || @ Athletics || 1–4 || Graveman (6–4) || Martinez (3–7) || Treinen (13) || 13,848 || 76–77 || L1  
|- style="text-align:center; background-color:#fbb"
| 154 || September 23 || @ Athletics || 0–1 || Alcántara (1–1) || González (8–12) || Treinen (14) || 38,034 || 76–78 || L2 
|- style="text-align:center; background-color:#fbb"
| 155 || September 24 || @ Athletics || 1–8 || Cotton (9–10) || Perez (12–12) || — || 18,601 || 76–79 || L3
|- style="text-align:center; background-color:#fbb"
| 156 || September 25 || Astros || 2–11 || McHugh (4–2) || Cashner (10–11) || — || 30,390 || 76–80 || L4
|- style="text-align:center; background-color:#fbb"
| 157 || September 26 || Astros || 3–14 || Keuchel (14–5) || Hamels (11–5) || — || 28,976 || 76–81 || L5
|- style="text-align:center; background-color:#fbb"
| 158 || September 27 || Astros || 2–12 || Verlander (15–8) || Martinez (3–8) || — || 26,053 || 76–82 || L6 
|- style="text-align:center; background-color:#fbb"
| 159 || September 28 || Athletics || 1–4 || Manaea (12–10) || González (8–13) || Treinen (15) || 41,664 || 76–83 || L7 
|- style="text-align:center; background-color:#cfc"
| 160 || September 29 || Athletics || 5–3 || Perez (13–12) || Alcántara (1–2) || Claudio (11) || 28,459 || 77–83 || W1
|- style="text-align:center; background-color:#cfc"
| 161 || September 30 || Athletics || 8–4 || Cashner (11–11) || Gossett (4–11) || — || 32,759 || 78–83 || W2 
|- style="text-align:center; background-color:#fbb"
| 162 || October 1 || Athletics || 2–5 || Mengden (3–2) || Hamels (11–6) || Treinen (16) || 33,961 || 78–84 || L1 
|-

|- style= 
| Legend:       = Win       = Loss       = PostponementBold = Rangers team member

Roster

Farm system

References

External links
2017 Schedule at Texas Rangers official site
2017 Texas Rangers season at Baseball Reference

Texas Rangers seasons
Texas Rangers
Texas Rangers